Arenivaga bolliana, known generally as the Boll's sand cockroach or Boll's sandroach, is a species of cockroach in the family Corydiidae. It is found in North America.

References

 Atkinson, Thomas H., Philip G. Koehler, and Richard S. Patterson (1991). "Catalog and Atlas of the Cockroaches of North America North of Mexico". Miscellaneous Publications of the Entomological Society of America, no. 78, 1-85.
 Poole, Robert W., and Patricia Gentili, eds. (1997). "Blattodea". Nomina Insecta Nearctica: A Check List of the Insects of North America: vol. 4: Non-Holometabolous Orders, 31-39.

Further reading

 

Cockroaches
Insects described in 1893